Cost per procedure, sometimes known as price per procedure, is a medical pricing model which describes the average cost of receiving a certain medical procedure.

References

Health care quality
Monopoly (economics)
Pricing